Félix Moloua is a Central African Republic politician. In February 2022, he was appointed Prime Minister of the Central African Republic. He was the previous minister of planning, economy and cooperation of the Central African Republic.

Other activities 
 African Development Bank (AfDB), Ex-Officio Member of the Board of Governors

References 

Living people
Finance ministers
Government ministers of the Central African Republic
Year of birth missing (living people)
Prime Ministers of the Central African Republic